She Married an Artist is a 1937 American romantic comedy film directed by Marion Gering and starring John Boles, Luli Deste, and Frances Drake.

The film's sets were designed by the art director Stephen Goosson.

Partial cast
 John Boles as Lee Thornwood  
 Luli Deste as Toni Bonnet  
 Frances Drake as Sally Dennis  
 Helen Westley as Martha Moriarty  
 Alexander D'Arcy as Phillip Corval  
 Albert Dekker as Whitney Holton  
 Marek Windheim as Jacques  
 Franklin Pangborn as Paul  
 Julie Bishop as Betty Dennis

References

Bibliography
 Goble, Alan.  The Complete Index to Literary Sources in Film. Walter de Gruyter, 1 Jan 1999.

External links
 

1937 films
1937 romantic comedy films
American romantic comedy films
Films directed by Marion Gering
Films set in Paris
Columbia Pictures films
American black-and-white films
1930s English-language films
1930s American films